The Palace of Charles of Lorraine is a neoclassical palace in the Royal Quarter of Brussels, Belgium. Its construction started in 1757 to serve as the residence of the Governor of the Habsburg Netherlands, Prince Charles Alexander of Lorraine, replacing the Palace of Orange-Nassau. It currently houses a museum, part of the Royal Library of Belgium (KBR).

Located on what is now the /, the palace lies atop the Coudenberg hill, not far from the Place Royale/Koningsplein and the Mont des Arts/Kunstberg, as well as nearby institutions such as the Royal Palace of Brussels and the Royal Museums of Fine Arts of Belgium. This area is served by Brussels Central Station, as well as by the metro stations Parc/Park (on lines 1 and 5) and Trône/Troon (on lines 2 and 6).

History

Inception and construction
The construction of the current palace was started in 1757 on the site where the former Palace of Orange-Nassau had stood. It was to serve as the residence of Prince Charles Alexander of Lorraine, the Governor-General of what was then Austrian Netherlands from 1744 until 1780. Indeed, in 1731, the nearby Palace of Coudenberg had been destroyed by fire and the court had moved to the Palace of Nassau, which from then on was known as the "New Court". An avid builder, Charles Alexander imagined grandiose projects for his capital. This old palace, however, was dilapidated and no longer adapted to the taste of the time. It was thus sold for little money and almost completely demolished (except for Saint George's Chapel), to make way for the new palace.

The first neoclassical wing, probably the work of the architect , was completed by the architect Laurent-Benoît Dewez after Faulte's death in 1766. A second wing in the same style, designed by the French architect , was attached perpendicularly to the palace in 1825 to house the Palace of National Industry, intended to host periodic exhibitions supported by the sovereign of the United Kingdom of the Netherlands, William I. Its construction coincided with the completion of the first section of the /, which ended temporarily at the foot of the Church of Our Blessed Lady of the Sablon.

Later usage and renovation
During the French period, the City of Brussels bought the palace to install a library, an art gallery and a cabinet of physics and natural history, constituting the Museum of the department of the Dyle, one of the fifteen departmental museums created under Napoleon's initiative, within the framework of the decentralisation of the Louvre in Paris. Bought by the Belgian State from the City, these collections form the embryo of Belgian artistic and literary heritage which will gradually be concentrated around the current /. In 1804, the royal chapel was entrusted by Napoleon to the Protestant community of Brussels and became Brussels Protestant Church. It has largely retained its original appearance.

Until 1878, the Brussels Salon, a periodic exhibition of work by living artists, took place in the former apartments of Charles Alexander of Lorraine. This situation was not ideal because the permanent collection had to be temporarily stored or covered during the exhibition. In addition, the exhibitors complained that all paintings were not lit equally well. Renovation works were carried out so that in 1830 a Great Gallery could open with a skylight. Nevertheless, low-hanging works were still difficult to see. In 1851, the exhibition was held in a temporary construction in the courtyard, before returning to its traditional location until 1881, when the first rooms of the new Museum of Fine Arts could be used. This museum remained the location for all subsequent editions.

Following Belgian Independence, the Royal Library of Belgium (KBR), founded in 1837, gradually took over the premises. It moved successively into the museum of painting and sculpture, then into the Palace of National Industry. The first was set up in the new museum on the Rue de la Régence and the second, which became the Museum of Industry, joined the Cinquantenaire Museum. Even the new wing, built at the rear of the Museum of Fine Arts by the architect E. Willame in 1879, to enclose the courtyard, was taken over by the administration and the numismatics cabinet of the Royal Library. Only the contemporary art collections of the museum remain on site.

Contemporary (1960s–present)
With the construction of the Mont des Arts/Kunstberg complex in the 1960s, it was decided to demolish more than three quarters of the palace. Since then, once through the gate, the visitor discovers a space amputated in its original momentum, despite its fine quality. If some admirable salons have been preserved behind the facades, it is however possible to associate the heavy interventions of the 1960s with a facade operation. These demolitions removed all traces of the old Palace of Nassau from which the new wing was born, so that today only the uprooted extension remains.

Since 22 November 2001, the palace has been listed as a protected monument by the Monuments and Sites Directorate of the Brussels-Capital Region. It closed in 2017 for renovations, and reopened in 2019. Today, it serves as a museum for 18th-century items. The exhibits originate from the collections of the Royal Museum of Art and History (RMAH) and the Royal Library of Belgium (KBR). The palace also hosts the Royal Library's temporary exhibitions.

Description
The Palace of Charles of Lorraine counts five halls, each decorated in stucco and silk, whose interiors are reminiscent of the Austrian Netherlands and the Bishopric of Liège in the 18th century. An impressive staircase, adorned with a statue of Hercules sculpted by the Flemish sculptor Laurent Delvaux, leads up to the first-floor rotunda. The rotunda's paving includes a central rosette made up of 28 types of Belgian marble, a sample of the Prince's collection of 5,000 minerals.

Royal Chapel
Donated to the Protestant Church by decree in 1804, with a definitive concession in 1816, the former private chapel of Prince Charles Alexander of Lorraine (also called the Royal Chapel) was integrated into the new constructions of the Mont des Arts/Kunstberg in 1965. Restored and modified several times, this sanctuary was built in 1760–61 and presents a Louis XVI-style interior with several Régence and Louis XV elements. It is adorned with remarkable rosettes, putty, rocaille-style elements and garlands. In the jubé, there is an organ by Bernhard Dreymann dating from 1839 to 1841.

Statue of Charles Alexander of Lorraine
Erected in 1848 at the centre of the Place du Musée, the statue of Charles Alexander of Lorraine was part of a series of sculptural works honouring great figures of Belgian history. Originally designed for Brussels Park, then for the Place Royale/Koningsplein, it had been ordered to the sculptor Louis Jehotte, also author of a statue of Charlemagne in Liège (Wallonia). Nowadays, the statue is relegated to the side of the square, above the technical block of the Museum of Modern Art.

See also

 List of castles and châteaux in Belgium
 Neoclassical architecture in Belgium
 History of Brussels
 Belgium in "the long nineteenth century"

References

Notes

Bibliography

External links

 Website of the museum

Palaces in Brussels
City of Brussels
Protected heritage sites in Brussels
Neoclassical architecture in Belgium
Neoclassical palaces
18th century in Brussels
Houses completed in 1757
Establishments in the Austrian Netherlands
1757 establishments in the Habsburg monarchy
1757 establishments in the Holy Roman Empire